Lungelo Mpangase is a South African actress, model and influencer. She is best known for her debut lead role as Khethiwe on the Mzansi Magic drama series eHostela and as Ntokozo in the Mzansi Magic series Mzali Wam.

Career
Her first big lead role was as Khethiwe, a young woman who aspires to become a maskandi star, in the Mzansi Magic drama series eHostela.

She then appeared in an Mzansi original film Themba Lam, which was made by graduates of M-Net's Magic in Motion Academy and first aired on Mzansi Magic on 15 June 2019. In that same year she was featured in the film Idlozi which aired on Mzansi Magic.

In 2021, she landed another lead role as Ntokozo, a graduate looking for work, in the Mzansi Magic drama series Mzali Wam. In that same year, she also hosted a bursary competition on her social media platforms. The competition was not only aimed at assisting students with tuition but was to also encourage aspiring actors.

Personal life
In 2019, Mpangase had a near-death experience when she was involved in a car accident that left her with an injured spine that had her off work for a couple of months, but she eventually recovered.

Controversy
In May 2021, she was allegedly physically attacked by a fellow actress on a set of her new movie in Vosloorus, Gauteng.

Filmography

Television

Film

Awards and nominations

References

External links 
 Official site
 

Living people
South African actresses
People from KwaZulu-Natal
Year of birth missing (living people)